Judy Chartrand (born 1959) is a Cree artist from Manitoba, Canada. She is an artist who grew up in the Downtown Eastside neighbourhood of Vancouver, British Columbia. Her works frequently confronts issues of postcolonialism, Indigenous feminism, socio-economic inequity and Indigenous knowledge expressed through the mediums of ceramics, found objects, archival photography and traditional Indigenous techniques of beadwork, moose hair tufting and quillwork.

Life and work
Chartrand is a self-taught ceramicist, she was initially inspired by the Pueblo San Ildefonso potter, Maria Martinez whose instructional videos she initially learned from. She was in her formative years influenced by trips to visit the Vancouver Museum located at the Carnegie Community Centre in downtown Vancouver where she developed an awareness of design and painting of ceramics.

And early motif utilized in her work was referencing Mimbres bowl forms and surface decoration, which is a design language she has referenced back to frequently in her work from renditions of historical Mimbres pots, to public art installation like the one done for the Olivia Skye Public Housing Building which featured illustrations of women in the style of Mimbres surface decoration.

Her series "If This is What You Call, ‘Being Civilized’, I'd rather go back to Being a ‘Savage’" is an evolution of the Mimbres pots, keeping the same bowl form but adding more personalized surface decoration from the artist. It currently exists in the private collection of contemporary art collector Bob Rennie and the permanent collection of the Surrey Art Gallery.

Works have also been collected by: Glenbow Museum, Saskatchewan Arts Board and the Smithsonian National Museum of the American Indian. Her work has been included in anthologies on arts and crafts including, Utopic Impulses: Contemporary Ceramics Practice.

Education
Chartrand studied for her Diploma in the Fine Arts Program at Langara College before being accepted to the Emily Carr University of Art and Design where she graduated with her BFA in 1998. She continued on to finish her master's degree in Fine Arts in Ceramics at the University of Regina (2003).

Exhibitions
 Playing With Fire, Vancouver, BC: Museum of Anthropology, 2019
 the poets have always preceded, North Vancouver, BC: Griffin Art Projects, 2019
 Bad Stitch: Audie Murray, Judy Chartrand, and Jeneen Frei Njootli Vancouver, BC: Macaulay & Co. Fine Art, 2018
 What a Wonderful World, Vancouver, BC: Bill Reid Gallery 2016-17 
 Métis Soup, Vancouver, BC: Macaulay & Co. Fine Art, 2016 <ref></</ref> 
 Judy Chartrand 1999–2013, Saskatoon, SK: AKA Artist Run, 2013  
 Malaysia-Canada Indigenous Communities Applied Arts Exhibition, Vancouver, BC: Pendulum Gallery, 2012
 Lost & Found: Haruko Okano, Judy Chartrand, and Wayde Compton Vancouver, BC: Access Gallery, 2006

References

1959 births
Living people
Cree people
Canadian women activists
Canadian ceramists
Women potters
Canadian women ceramists